Kalinovka is a rural locality (a settlement) in Plotnikovsky Selsoviet, Kamensky District, Altai Krai, Russia. The population was 67 as of 2013. There are 2 streets.

Geography 
Kalinovka is located 45 km south of Kamen-na-Obi (the district's administrative centre) by road. Lugovoye is the nearest rural locality.

References 

Rural localities in Kamensky District, Altai Krai